Hidden character may refer to:

 A non-printing character in computer-based text processing and digital typesetting
 A secret character (video games) in video games
 An unseen character in fiction
 Hidden character stone